is a Japanese musician and leader of the Johnny's Entertainment group NEWS.

Biography
Koyama, born in Sagamihara, Kanagawa as the youngest of two children, is the oldest member of NEWS and is often seen as the mother figure of the group.

Upon entering Johnny's Entertainment on 21 January 2001, Koyama started out with the unit B.A.D. which stands for Beautiful American Dream. His second unit as a junior was B.B.D. which at first stood for Bad Boys Dancing, but was later changed to Best Beat Dancing. In October 2001, he was chosen as a member of Domoto Koichi's project, J-Support, alongside fellow NEWS members Hironori Kusano and Shigeaki Kato. It was in this unit that Koyama started out as an announcer for shows such as the Ya-Ya-yah Show, and this has carried through to NEWS, which he joined in September 2003.

In 2007, he graduated from Meiji University's Department of History and Geography with a degree in Oriental History. He also occasionally participates in dramas such as guest starring in his bandmate Yamashita Tomohisa's drama Kurosagi.

From 2006 until March 2011, he hosted the popular TV variety show Shounen Club (Boys Club) alongside KAT-TUN member Nakamaru Yuichi.  He could be seen as a newscaster on NTV's daily news program called "News Every".

Scandal
On 8 June 2018, Koyama's entertainment career was halted. He attended a party where he gave an underage girl alcohol. The drinking age in Japan is 20 years old, and while she said she was 20 and legally able to drink, it was later discovered that she was in fact younger. This put his entire career on hold, including his entertainment activities with Johnny's Entertainment and his job as a newscaster for the program "News Every."

As of 27 June 2018, Koyama has resumed his entertainment activities. In December 2018, Koyama left the program "News Every."

Appearances

Dramas
 Kanojo ga Shinjyatta (彼女が死んじゃった) (2004)
 Unlucky Deizu: Natsume no Bōsō  (2004)
 Kurosagi (Episode 2 only) (2006)
 Ns' Aoi (Ns'あおい) (2006)
 Hana Yome wa Yakudoshi (2006)
 Yukan Club (Episode 6 only) (2007)
 Loss:Time:Life (ロス：タイム：ライフ) (Episode 2 only) (2008)
 Guests of Room 0 (0号室の客) ( 5th story ) (2010)
 Lucky Seven (2012)
 Juyo Sankounin Tantei (重要参考人探偵）(2017)
 Zero: Ikkaku Senkin Game (ゼロ 一獲千金ゲーム) (Episode 9–10) (2018)

Stage performances
 High School Musical (2007) as Troy Bolton
 Loss:Time:Life (2008)
 Call (2009)
 Room 0 (2010) as Shigeto Oyama
 Hello, Goodbye (2012) as Kumagai Ango

Variety shows 
 Ya-Ya-yah (TV Tokyo, 2003–2007)
 Hi! Hey! Say (TV Tokyo, 2007–2009)
 Shounen Club (co-hosts with Yuichi Nakamaru) (NHK, 2006–2011)
 Ashita Tsukaeru Shinrigaku! Teppan Note (2008)
 Soukon (co-hosts with NEWS) (NTV, 2009–2010)
 news every (NTV, 2010–2019)
 Mirai Theater (co-hosts with NEWS member, Shigeaki Kato) (NTV, 2012–2015)
 Karaoke 18ban (NTV, 2015)
 Chikarauta (NTV, 2015–2017)
 Hen Lab (co-hosts with NEWS) (NTV, 2015–2016)
 NEWS na Futari (co-hosts with NEWS member, Shigeaki Kato) (TBS, 2015-ongoing)
 Shounen Club Premium (co-hosts with NEWS) (NHK, 2016–2019)

References

External links 
 

1984 births
Living people
People from Sagamihara
News (band) members
Japanese idols
Japanese baritones
Musicians from Kanagawa Prefecture
21st-century Japanese singers
21st-century Japanese male actors
21st-century Japanese male singers